Haythem Mhamdi (born 7 February 1989) is a Tunisian professional footballer who plays for Libyan side Al-Akhdar as a midfielder.

References

External links
 

1989 births
Living people
Tunisian footballers
Tunisian expatriate footballers
EGS Gafsa players
ES Métlaoui players
Al-Sahel SC (Saudi Arabia) players
Olympique Béja players
Al Safa FC players
Jerash FC players
Al Akhdar SC players
Tunisian Ligue Professionnelle 1 players
Saudi First Division League players
Saudi Second Division players
Libyan Premier League players
Expatriate footballers in Saudi Arabia
Expatriate footballers in Libya
Tunisian expatriate sportspeople in Saudi Arabia
Tunisian expatriate sportspeople in Libya
[[Category:Association football midfielders]